Jack B. Jacobs is a former justice of the Delaware Supreme Court, having served on that court from 2003 to 2014. He also served as a vice chancellor of the Delaware Court of Chancery from 1985 to 2003. He graduated from University of Chicago and Harvard Law School.

References

External links
http://judgepedia.org/Jack_Jacobs

Living people
Justices of the Delaware Supreme Court
Vice Chancellors of Delaware
Year of birth missing (living people)
Place of birth missing (living people)
University of Chicago alumni
Harvard Law School alumni